Evgenia Andreevna Zabolotskaya (1935–2020) was a Russian-American physicist known for her contributions to nonlinear acoustics. The Khokhlov–Zabolotskaya equation and the Khokhlov–Zabolotskaya–Kuznetsov equation in nonlinear acoustics are named in part for her.

Education and career
Zabolotskaya studied physics at Moscow State University, completing her PhD there in 1968 under the supervision of Rem Khokhlov. After working at the Andreyev Acoustics Institute, she returned to Moscow State University in 1971, appointed to the biology department.

After meeting and beginning to work with University of Texas at Austin mechanical engineering professors David Blackstock and Mark Hamilton, starting in 1982, Zabolotskaya moved to the University of Texas in 1991. From 1997 to 2000 she was on leave from the university to work at a start-up company in Virginia. She retired in 2015.

She died on June 2, 2020 in Santa Fe, New Mexico.

Recognition
Zabolotskaya won the USSR State Prize in 1985.
She is the 2017 winner of the Silver Medal in Physical Acoustics of the Acoustical Society of America.

She was honored by the Women in Acoustics Committee of the Acoustical Society of America shortly before her death and highlighted in an article on work-parenting harmony.

References

1935 births
2020 deaths
Russian physicists
American physicists
Russian acoustical engineers
Moscow State University alumni
Academic staff of Moscow State University
University of Texas at Austin faculty
Recipients of the USSR State Prize
Soviet emigrants to the United States